Brahmanbaria-1 is a constituency represented in the Jatiya Sangsad (National Parliament) of Bangladesh since 2018 by Bodruddoza Md. Farhad Hossain of the Awami League.

Boundaries 
The constituency encompasses Nasirnagar Upazila.

History 
The constituency was created in 1984 from the Comilla-6 constituency when the former Comilla District was split into three districts: Brahmanbaria, Comilla, and Chandpur.

Ahead of the 2008 general election, the Election Commission redrew constituency boundaries to reflect population changes revealed by the 2001 Bangladesh census. The 2008 redistricting altered the boundaries of the constituency.

Ahead of the 2014 general election, the Election Commission reduced the boundaries of the constituency. Previously the constituency had included three union parishads of Brahmanbaria Sadar Upazila (after 2010, the new Bijoynagar Upazila): Budhanti, Chandura, and Harashpur.

Members of Parliament

Elections

Elections in the 2010s 

Mohammad Sayedul Haque died in December 2017. Bodruddoza Md. Farhad Hossain of the Awami League was elected in a March 2018 by-election.'''

Elections in the 2000s

Elections in the 1990s

References

External links
 

Parliamentary constituencies in Bangladesh
Brahmanbaria District